Schwarz-Rot-Gold is a German television series.

List of episodes

See also
List of German television series

External links
 

German crime television series
1982 German television series debuts
1996 German television series endings
Television shows set in Hamburg
German-language television shows
Das Erste original programming